

Present laws
Road Traffic Act 1972
Highways Act 1980
Road Traffic Regulation Act 1984
Road Traffic Offenders Act 1988
Traffic Signs Regulations and General Directions
Highway Code

History
The Locomotives on Highways Act 1896
The Motor Car Act 1903
The Roads Act 1920
The Road Traffic Act 1930
The Road Traffic Act 1934

Offences that apply to all vehicles

Causing bodily harm by wanton or furious driving

Motor vehicle offences
Causing death by dangerous driving
Dangerous driving
Careless driving/Driving without due care and attention

Motor vehicle document offences: see English criminal law#Forgery, personation and cheating

And see Drink driving (United Kingdom)

Bicycles
Taylor v Goodwin (1879) 4 QBD 228 bicycles are defined as "carriages" and therefore not allowed on pavements; biker convicted for "furious" cycling.
Cycle Tracks Act 1984, allows footpaths to be converted into cycle paths
Highway Act 1835 s 72 (as amended by Local Government Act 1888 s 85(1)) prohibits cycling on footways (pavement beside carriageway). The fixed penalty is £30 under the Road Traffic Offenders Act 1988 s 51 and Sch 3.
Crank v Brooks [1980] RTR 441, wheeling a bike is not "riding" it, per Waller LJ,
Licensing Act 1872, an offence to be drunk and in charge of a bike.
Road Traffic Act 1988 s 30, creates an offence for being incapable of having proper control, not necessarily being a bit drunk.
Maximum penalty for dangerous cycling is £2500.
£30 fine for running a red light.
Road Vehicles (Construction and Use) Regulations 1986, amended 2003, cyclists not included in law making it illegal to talk on a mobile phone.

Northern Ireland

Offences that apply to all vehicles

Causing bodily harm by wanton or furious driving

Motor vehicle offences
Causing death or grievous bodily injury by dangerous driving
Dangerous driving

See also
Transport in the United Kingdom

Notes

External links
Carlton Reid, 'Cycling and the law' (retrieved 2.10.2009) Bikeforall.net

Road transport in the United Kingdom
Law of the United Kingdom
Traffic law